Velikaya is a rural locality (a village) in Voskresenskoye Rural Settlement, Cherepovetsky District, Vologda Oblast, Russia. The population was 1 as of 2002.

Geography 
Velikaya is located 74 km northwest of Cherepovets (the district's administrative centre) by road. Popovo is the nearest rural locality.

References 

Rural localities in Cherepovetsky District